In England, local authorities are required to adopt one of three types of executive arrangements, having either an "elected mayor and cabinet", a "leader and cabinet", or a "committee system". The type of arrangement used determines how decisions will be made within the council. In councils which use the elected mayor system, the mayor is directly elected by the electorate to provide political leadership for the council and has power to make executive decisions. In councils which use the leader and cabinet model (the most commonly used model), the elected councillors choose one of their number to be the "leader of the council", and that person provides political leadership and can make executive decisions. Where the committee system is used, executive power is exercised through various committees rather than being focussed on one person. Many councils which use the committee system still nominate one of the councillors to hold the title "leader of the council", albeit without the same powers as a leader under the leader and cabinet model.

Historical background
From the establishment of elected local authorities in England in the nineteenth century until the Local Government Act 2000, councils used a system of committees for decision making. There was no legislative requirement for any councillor to be declared the leader, with the principle being that all the elected councillors were equal in status. In practice, political groups had their own leaders, and when a council was under the control of a particular party, local media would commonly refer to the leader of the controlling party as being the "leader of the council". It was also generally recognised that the most powerful political position on a council was the person who chaired the main policy-making committee, which in most councils was called the policy and resources committee. Usually, the leader of the largest party would chair that committee. Some councils explicitly acknowledged the existence of a leader of the council, others did not. The role of leader of the council in that regard was similar to that of the British prime minister; the post had not been explicitly created, but gradually emerged.

Executive arrangement types

The Local Government Act 2000 sought to strengthen public engagement with local democracy, and streamline the system of committees, introducing the models of directly elected mayors and cabinets, leaders and cabinets, as well as a third option for an elected mayor and council manager, which was only adopted by one authority and was later withdrawn. Additionally, lower tier authorities with a population under 85,000 were allowed to continue to use a committee system.

Leader and cabinet
The leader and cabinet model was introduced under the Local Government Act 2000. It consists of the leader and the cabinet itself, which is usually formed by the majority party in the local authority, where there is one, or by a coalition which comes together to elect a leader. The council elects the leader, and the leader appoints the other members of the cabinet. Each cabinet member holds a separate portfolio, such as housing, finance, economic development, or education. Decisions may be delegated to the individual members, or taken by the cabinet as a whole. These decisions are scrutinised by one or more "overview and scrutiny" committees, which may be dedicated to one or more service areas.

The leader and cabinet are responsible for policies, plans, and strategies, which must be within the budget adopted by the full council. These will be reported to the overall "full" council, which is convened to bring together all elected members of the authority at regular meetings. One or more overview and scrutiny committees holds the cabinet to account for its decisions and is responsible that the democratic checks and balances are maintained.

The principal executive decisions taken by the council as a whole are to appoint the leader, to approve the leader's budget, to adopt development plan documents, and to agree on the council's constitution. Beyond that, it may raise issues, urge the leader, cabinet, or cabinet members to take actions, or pass a vote of no confidence in the leader.

In addition, the compliance of councillors with their code of conduct may be overseen by a standards committee, although since the coming into effect of the Localism Act 2011 this can be dispensed with and its functions can be delegated to a monitoring officer.

Elected mayor and cabinet

The elected mayor and cabinet model was introduced by the Local Government Act 2000. Councils currently operating the mayoral model include:

Elected mayor and council manager
The elected mayor and council manager option was also introduced by the Local Government Act 2000, but withdrawn by the Local Government and Public Involvement in Health Act 2007. The only local authority to adopt the model was Stoke-on-Trent City Council, reverting to leader and cabinet in 2008.

Alternative arrangements
Section 31 of the Local Government Act 2000 allowed district councils in two tier areas, with populations under 85,000, to propose alternative executive arrangements. This was superseded by the changes made by the Localism Act 2011 and the renewed availability of the committee system to all local authorities.

Committee system
Under the Localism Act 2011, principal authorities (such as unitary authorities, county councils, and district councils) were allowed to return to decision-making by committees, the method of local government administration for all councils prior to 2000. Under this model power is exercised, alongside full council, by a number of committees, made up of councillors in proportion to their parties' representation on the council. Such councils may choose to nominate a councillor as the "leader of the council" for the purposes of representing the political leadership of the council, particularly in relations with external bodies. If no leader is nominated, as was the case prior to 2000, the chair of the council's main policy committee may be informally deemed to be the council's de facto leader.

"Hybrid" arrangements
Some councils operate governance arrangements which have the characteristics of more than one formal governance option. For example, an authority operating under conventional executive arrangements but whose overview and scrutiny committees operate in a manner similar to those under the committee system (developing policy, taking an active part in the decision-making process, etc.).

Arrangements for moving between governance options
Provisions exist in legislation for councils to move from one governance model to another.

References

 
Local government in England